Army Group Reserve or Army Group Rupture, G. A. R.) was a grouping of French field armies during World War I, which was created on January 1, 1917 to fight in the Offensive of Chemin des Dames. The Army group was dissolved on May 8, 1917 after the failure of the Offensive. The Army Group was recreated after the German spring offensive of 1918.

Composition

April 15, 1917 
 6th Army (général Charles Mangin)
 10th Army (général Denis Auguste Duchêne)
 5th Army (général Olivier Mazel)

March 23, 1918 
 1st Army (général Marie-Eugène Debeney)
 3rd Army (général Georges Louis Humbert)

July 1, 1918 
 6th Army (général Jean Degoutte)
 10th Army (général Charles Mangin)

Commanders 
 Général Joseph Alfred Micheler (January 1, 1917 – May 8, 1917)
 Général Émile Fayolle  (February 23, 1918 – December 1918)

Sources 
 The French Army and the First World War by Elizabeth Greenhalgh
 14-18 : Espoirs et drames sur le Chemin des Dames

Military units and formations of France in World War I
Military units and formations established in 1917
Army groups of France
Army groups of World War I